William Blount, 7th Baron Mountjoy, (c. 1561 – 1594) was an English peer.

William Blount was born circa 1561, the eldest son of James Blount, 6th Baron Mountjoy (c.1533-1582) and Catherine Leigh. He inherited his title on the death of his father. He never married.

On his death in 1594 in Hook, Dorset, the title passed to his younger brother Charles Blount, 8th Baron Mountjoy.

References

William
Blount, William
1560s births
1594 deaths
People from Devon
16th-century English nobility
Barons Mountjoy (1465)